Let's Be Nice is the second album by Boston post-grunge band Birdbrain released on February 18, 1997, on TVT Records. The album features their song "Youth of America" that was featured in the films Scream, and Masterminds. It received positive reviews, but failed to launch the band into the mainstream. "(She's Always) Glowing" was later featured on the TVT compilation Got TVT?.

Singles
The only single released from the album was "Youth of America", which had been released from the album the year before. A video was released for the song which contained parts of the film Scream.

Track listing

Personnel
 Joey Ammo – vocals, guitar, production
 Mikel Benway – drums, vocals
 Joe McCarthy – bass guitar
 Tim Patalan – production
 Jack Joseph Puig – mixing
 Bob Ludwig – mastering

References

1997 albums
Birdbrain (band) albums
TVT Records albums
Albums recorded at Long View Farm